Andrei Vladimirovich Soluyanov (11 August 1959 – 18 March 2022) was a Russian politician. He died on 18 March 2022 at the age of 62.

References

1959 births
2022 deaths
People from Glazov
Second convocation members of the State Duma (Russian Federation)